Samuel Robert Rivers (born September 2, 1977, Jacksonville, Florida) is the bassist and backing vocalist of the band Limp Bizkit, and one of its founding members.

Early life
Rivers' musical career started fairly early on, with him playing the tuba in a band in Arlington Middle School. He got into music initially because of John Otto, who played jazz-style drums.

Many have said that Otto is a cousin of Rivers, but during a documentary that was recorded of the band recording their second album, Rivers admits that they initially thought they were cousins but realised neither parents were related.

He attended Bishop Kenny High School. He played guitar before he played bass, but switched at the suggestion of his music teacher.

Career

Limp Bizkit

Rivers first met Fred Durst while working at a Chick-fil-A in a mall in Jacksonville. The two started talking, and found they shared several interests, including skateboarding and music. They decided to get together for a jam session. Rivers was becoming an accomplished bass guitarist, and Durst was to be a vocalist. Together with several other people they formed a short-lived band called Malachi Sage. (Rivers' talents on guitar would later come into play in Limp Bizkit's Results May Vary album, the only album not featuring longtime guitarist Wes Borland, with Rivers playing both guitar and bass on select songs such as "Creamer" and "Lonely World".)

When the band did not work out, the two decided to try again, and this time Otto came into the picture to be the drummer at the suggestion of Rivers. In 1994, the three formed Limp Bizkit. Later on guitarist Wes Borland came into the fold, as well as DJ Lethal, in 1996. Rivers was the youngest member of the band. When their first album Three Dollar Bill, Yall was released, he was 19 years old.

In 2015, Rivers reportedly left Limp Bizkit following a diagnosis of degenerative disc disease. However, Rivers revealed in 2020 his departure from Limp Bizkit was due to liver disease caused by excessive drinking. Rivers subsequently received a liver transplant. In absentia, live bass duties were covered by Samuel Gerhard Mpungu and Tsuzumi Okai.

He was voted Best Bass Player at the 2000 Gibson Awards.

Recent work
After Limp Bizkit went on hiatus, Rivers  became a producer for local bands in Jacksonville. He produced the debut albums by Burn Season and The Embraced. Most recently, Rivers has been producing for the Orlando-based band Indorphine. Aside from producing their new studio material, Rivers got them booked as the opening act for a Mushroomhead/SOiL concert.

In early 2009, Rivers reunited with Limp Bizkit for tours and their sixth studio album, Gold Cobra released in 2011.

Rivers is now pursuing another project with Burn Season vocalist Damien Starkey  in a band called Sleepkillers, along with Adam Latiff and Saliva vocalist Bobby Amaru, who was also a founding member and drummer for Burn Season. They released their self titled debut album on March 1, 2019.

Personal life
His influences include bands such as Black Sabbath and Megadeth. Rivers cites Jeff Ament from Pearl Jam as a big influence on his playing.

In the early 2000s, Rivers married Kinter Atkins. They divorced due to personal issues. Currently, Rivers is in a relationship with pornographic actress Kayla Paige.

Equipment
Rivers was originally endorsed by Ibanez, and one of his basses was a customized BTB 5-string, but he then used custom made Warwick basses, with LEDs in the fretboard. Since 2019, Sam Rivers is using 5-string Fender Jazz Basses live with Limp Bizkit. Rivers has also been seen using Wal Basses since 2005, mainly in the studio and uses Ampeg and Warwick amps.

Collaborations
 Marilyn Manson ft. Sam Rivers - "Redeemer" (Queen of the Damned (soundtrack))
 David Draiman ft. Sam Rivers - "Forsaken" (Queen of the Damned (soundtrack))
 Black Light Burns ft. Sam Rivers - "I Have a Need" (Cruel Melody)

References

1977 births
Living people
American rock bass guitarists
American male bass guitarists
Limp Bizkit members
Liver transplant recipients
Musicians from Jacksonville, Florida
Guitarists from Florida
Bishop Kenny High School alumni
21st-century American bass guitarists